The NJMP ARCA 150 is an ARCA Racing Series presented by Menards race held annually at the New Jersey Motorsports Park in Millville, New Jersey. The inaugural race was held in 2008. Andrew Ranger has won the most times, winning the event four times from 2011 to 2014.

Past winners

2008: Race shortened due to rain

References

2008 establishments in New Jersey
ARCA Menards Series races
Motorsport in New Jersey
Recurring sporting events established in 2008